The Mutants is the fourth serial of the ninth season of the British science fiction television series Doctor Who, which was first broadcast in six weekly parts on BBC1 from 8 April to 13 May 1972.

The serial is set on and high above the Earth colony world Solos in the 30th century. In the serial, the Marshal of Solos (Paul Whitsun-Jones) plots to change Solos' atmosphere to make it breathable for humans but not for the native Solonians. At the same time, the alien time traveller the Third Doctor (Jon Pertwee) delivers a set of tablets containing lost information about the Solonians' life cycle to the Solonian Ky (Garrick Hagon).

Plot

In the 30th century, the Earth Empire is contracting and plans are being made to decolonise the colony world of Solos. The militaristic Marshal and other human soldiers, known as Overlords, rule it from Skybase One, an orbiting space station. The Marshal opposes the decolonisation plans outlined to him by an Administrator sent from Earth, and is also obsessed with eradicating the Mutants or "Mutts" that have sprung up on the planet below. The Solonians themselves are a tribal people, split between those who actively oppose the occupation, such as Ky, and those like Varan who collaborate with the imperialists. The Marshal and Varan ensure the Administrator is murdered before he can confirm to Ky and other tribal chiefs that the Earth Empire is indeed withdrawing from Solos.

The Third Doctor and Jo arrive on Skybase One, their TARDIS having been transported there by the Time Lords. They have with them a message box which will only open for an intended recipient – and that is not the Marshal or his entourage – but seems to be for Ky, who has been framed for the murder of the Administrator. Jo and Ky flee to the surface of Solos, which is poisonous to humans during daylight hours. This quickly affects Jo, but she survives with Ky's help. The Doctor learns from the Marshal and his chief scientist Jaeger that they are involved in an experiment using rocket barrages to terraform Solos, making the air breathable for humans, regardless of the cost to indigenous life.

Varan by now has discovered the Marshal's treachery but events make him an outlaw on Skybase. The Doctor makes contact and together they persuade Stubbs and Cotton, the most senior soldiers to the Marshal that much is wrong on Skybase. He then flees to Solos with Varan, and at the thaesium mine where Ky and Jo are hiding he encounters many Mutts, who are not as hostile as they first appeared. The Doctor passes the message box to Ky, and it opens to reveal ancient tablets and etchings which are written in the language of the Old Ones of the planet. Help in avoiding poisonous gas released by the Marshal is provided by a fugitive human scientist, Sondergaard, who lives in the caves and knows much about Solonian anthropology. Sondergaard explains he tried to inform Earth Control about the Marshal's evil, but he was prevented and forced to flee to the caves, where the radiation seems to have affected him. He interprets the contents of the box as a "lost Solos Book of Genesis", and the Doctor then calculates a Solonian year to be equivalent to two thousand human years, with natural changes in the population every five hundred years within the cycle. Investigating a more radioactive part of the caves, the Doctor thus deduces the Mutant phase is a natural part of the Solonian life-cycle.

Varan is by now becoming a Mutt himself. He hides this fact and leads a Solonian attack on the Skybase which results in his death and those of many of his warriors. On Skybase Jo, Ky, Stubbs and Cotton are captured by the Marshal, and Stubbs is killed in a failed escape attempt. The Doctor returns to the Skybase – without Sondergaard, who seems too weak following the radiation contamination. He returns to the caves to communicate with the Mutants and explain to them their change is natural and not to be feared.

The Doctor surmises the Marshal to be mad. It becomes clear that the Earth Government has now dispatched an Investigator to look into the strange events on Solos. The Marshal's rocket attacks have not terraformed the planet, but they have left a hideous environmental impact and he knows he must clean this up or face problems when the Investigator arrives. Under duress (the Marshal has taken Jo prisoner) the Doctor uses Jaeger's technology to conduct a rapid decontamination of the planet's surface. The Investigator arrives and demands answers, but is given more lies by the Marshal, supported by the Doctor. Luckily Jo, Ky and Cotton have escaped detention and arrive in time to help the Investigator see the truth of the situation on Solos and the crimes of the Marshal and Jaeger. The Doctor accuses them of "the most brutal and callous series of crimes against a defenceless people it's ever been my misfortune to encounter." Sondergaard now reaches the Skybase with some Mutants, one of whom scares the Investigator enough that he accepts the Marshal's recommendation that the creatures be killed.

Ky now begins a process of mutation, but it is accelerated beyond the Mutant phase so that he emerges as a radiant angel-like super-being. He communicates with thought transference, can float and can move through whole walls. Dispensing justice, Ky eradicates the Marshal. Jaeger has been killed too and the Investigator now makes sense of the situation. Sondergaard and Cotton elect to stay on Solos to see the other Solonians go through the mutation process, while Jo and the Doctor slip away, their mission from the Time Lords complete.

Production
Working titles for this story included Independence and The Emergents.

Writers Bob Baker and Dave Martin, as well as producer Barry Letts, intended for The Mutants to have an anti-racist message. The basis of the story came from Letts, who had submitted the idea for Season 4 but it was rejected by script editor Gerry Davis.

The opening shot of the story features a bedraggled, hermit-like bearded figure (Sidney Johnson) shambling out of the mist towards the camera.  Both fans and Jon Pertwee alike have compared the scene to the "It's" man at the start of most episodes of Monty Python's Flying Circus.

The mines of Solos were filmed at Chislehurst Caves near Bromley. They also filmed at Bluewater Quarry which was the setting for the planet Solos, before it was a shopping centre and Stone House Farm Caves which was the entrance to Solos caves.

Cast notes
George Pravda had previously played Denes in The Enemy of the World (1968) and would later play Castellan Spandrell in The Deadly Assassin (1976).

Christopher Coll had previously played Technician Phipps opposite Patrick Troughton in the 1969 serial The Seeds of Death.

Geoffrey Palmer had previously played Masters in Doctor Who and the Silurians (1970) and would later play
Captain Hardaker in the 2007 Christmas special "Voyage of the Damned".

Broadcast and reception

In 2009, Patrick Mulkern of Radio Times stated that the serial was "peculiarly variable", with uneven performances and quality; he wrote that "the first episode is surprisingly leaden and unengaging, whereas episode four is one of the most stimulating and creatively innovative under Barry Letts' stewardship". He praised the design of the Mutants and some of the cliffhangers. DVD Talk's John Sinnott gave the story two and a half out of five stars, calling it "terribly average" but "a solid adventure ... worth watching". He was critical of the acting, especially Rick James, and felt that overall it was too long and "a bit convoluted". IGN reviewer Arnold T. Blumburg gave the story a score of 7 out of 10, writing that there was more to be appreciated as an adult to see "its role as a hard-edged indictment of the culture in which it was created". Ian Berriman of SFX gave The Mutants three out of five stars, noting its ambition to tackle social issues but concluded that the execution was "bungled".

Commercial releases

In print

A novelisation of this serial, written by Terrance Dicks, was published by Target Books in September 1977.

Home media
This story was released on VHS in February 2003 and was the penultimate Jon Pertwee story to be released in this format. The story was released on DVD on 31 January 2011.

The music from this serial was released as part of Doctor Who: Devils' Planets – The Music of Tristram Cary in 2003.

Notes

References

External links

Doctor Who Appreciation Society interview with Jeremy Bear, designer of The Mutants

Target novelisation

On Target — Doctor Who and the Mutants

Third Doctor serials
Doctor Who serials novelised by Terrance Dicks
1972 British television episodes
Television episodes written by Bob Baker (scriptwriter)
Fiction set in the 30th century
Mutants in fiction